Atalaya multiflora, known as the broad leaved whitewood, is a rare and endangered rainforest tree of the soapberry family native to eastern Australia.

The habitat is in the drier rainforest areas, often on rocky slopes of basalt. However, it also is seen on sub-tropical lowland rainforest growing on alluvial soils. It was described by prolific botanist George Bentham in his Flora Australiensis in 1863, and was given the specific name multiflora because of the numerous flowers.

Description 
A small tree up to 25 metres (80 ft) tall with a stem diameter of 40 cm (16 in). The base of the tree isn't quite cylindrical, but somewhat flanged and crooked. The bark is relatively smooth, coloured greyish brown. Small branches are thick,  marked with lenticels and showing obvious leaf scars.

Leaves 

The compound leaves are arranged alternately on the stem and pinnate in shape, 7 to 24 cm (3–10 in) long with a stem 15 to 40 mm long. The leaflets are 4 to 12 cm (1.6–5 in) long, 1.5 to 4 cm (0.6-1.6 in) wide with a stem 2 to 5 mm long. There are usually two to three leaflets per compound leaf, oblong or ovate in shape, without leaf serrations. Relatively thick and notched at the tip of the leaf. There are around 12 pairs of straight lateral leaf veins per leaflet, more easily seen on the underside.

Flowers, fruit & regeneration 

From December to January, panicles form at the end of branchlets with abundant tiny creamy flowers. The flowers have five petals and sepals, and with eight stamens. Near the flowers are many small bracts.

The paired winged fruit (a fawn coloured samarae) forms from March to May. Each with a wing around 3 cm long opposite the round seed at the other end. Seeds last only a very short while on the ground, as they are soon attacked by insects. Fresh seeds should be soaked to kill insect larvae, then planted as soon as possible.

References

Flora of New South Wales
Flora of Queensland
multiflora
Trees of Australia